Ormas is an unincorporated community in Whitley and Noble counties, in the U.S. state of Indiana.

History
Ormas was founded in 1856. The community's name honors Ormas Jones, an early settler.

A post office was established at Ormas in 1880, and remained in operation until it was discontinued in 1904.

Geography

References

Unincorporated communities in Noble County, Indiana
Unincorporated communities in Whitley County, Indiana
Unincorporated communities in Indiana